Richmond Place, now known as Asgill House, is a Grade I listed 18th-century Palladian villa on Old Palace Lane in Richmond, London (historically in Surrey), overlooking the River Thames. The house is on the former site of the river frontage and later the brewhouse for the medieval and Tudor Richmond Palace. It has been described as a "among the last villas of importance to be erected on the banks of the Thames".

It was returned to its original appearance in a restoration of 1969–70 by Donald Insall Associates. This included removing the Victorian extensions.

Asgill House is now leased from the Crown Estate as a private residence.

The rear garden contains a 200-year-old copper beech tree, one of the Great Trees of London.

Gallery

References

1757 establishments in England
Buildings and structures on the River Thames
Crown Estate
Grade I listed buildings in the London Borough of Richmond upon Thames
Grade I listed houses in London
History of the London Borough of Richmond upon Thames
Houses completed in 1758
Houses in the London Borough of Richmond upon Thames
Palladian architecture in England
Richmond, London
Robert Taylor buildings
Villas in the United Kingdom